West London NHS Trust is an NHS trust which provides mental and physical health services to the London boroughs of Ealing, Hammersmith and Fulham and Hounslow. It also provides some services on a national basis, including forensic and high-security services.

The trust operates across several sites, including Broadmoor Hospital in Crowthorne and St Bernard's Hospital in Hanwell.

History 
The trust was established as the West London Mental Health NHS Trust on 1 October 2000, and took its current name on 31 August 2018.

Middlesex County Asylum, Hanwell (1831–1889)
London County Asylum, Hanwell (1889–1917)
London County Mental Hospital (1918–1928)
Hanwell Mental Hospital (1929–1937)
St Bernard's Hospital (1938–1980)
Psychiatric Unit (1980–1992) –  part of a re-organised complex of divisions on same site and called Ealing General Hospital with a central corporate body.
West London Mental Healthcare (NHS) Trust. (1992–1999) See: Statutory Instrument 1992 No. 2539. The West London Healthcare National Health Service Trust (Establishment) Order 1992.
Ealing, Hammersmith & Fulham Mental Health (NHS) Trust (1999–2001)
West London Mental Health NHS Trust (2001–24 September 2018)
West London NHS Trust (25 September 2018 – present)

Some of the trust's services based at St Bernard's Hospital, Hanwell.

Here the first superintendent Dr (later Sir) William & Mrs Mildred Ellis who were so much impressed with Moral therapy and humane treatment they saw offered to people suffering Mental disorders at the Quaker Asylum in York that they both imposed these methods on the staff at Hanwell. This was as such the very first large scale experiment. The second superintendent brought mechanical restraints – as a form of treatment – back. The third superintendent Dr John Conolly against stiff opposition backed up with much vitriol, took the example further, and did away with all mechanical restraints. To the surprise and disbelief of many he found, like the Ellises before, that bedlam diminished, behaviour became less defensive and cooperation improved dramatically, and many recovered or much improved. This event added to his other pioneering work such as developing proper diets and conditions for his patients and battles to set up regular training lecture specialising in mental health, for doctor training, all led to him receiving worldwide recognition.

Broadmoor high secure hospital:
In order to end the isolation suffered by the high secure services from the rest of the NHS, the Health Act 1999 was passed, allowing NHS Trusts to provide for these.  After a three-month consultation in the early part of the following year it was agreed that the high secure services based at Broadmoor Hospital and those provided by the Ealing, Hammersmith and Fulham Mental Health NHS Trust should be combined into one organisation. This created the West London Mental Health NHS Trust, which took over governance in 2001; the Trust then changed its name to West London NHS Trust on 25 September 2018.

Local services division

It won a contract for community services in Ealing for 10 years from May 2019 leading a partnership with Central and North West London NHS Foundation Trust and Hillingdon Hospitals NHS Foundation Trust.

Forensic services division
In November 2004 a new directorate, the Woman's Secure Services was created. This was to separate the medium secure women's facilities from Broadmoor Hospital and relocate them on the Ealing site.

The Paddock Centre (70 beds) – Dangerous Severe Personality Disorder and Broadmoor Hospital (300 bed) – male High Secure Service are at Crowthorne in Berkshire. 
The Orchard (60 bed) – (female Enhanced Medium Secure and Low Secure services), Three Bridges Unit (male Medium Secure services), The Tony Hillis Wing – (male Medium and Low Secure services) and The Wells Unit (Forensic Child and Adolescent Mental Health service) are all at the Ealing site.

Clinical Service Units and Service Lines
In 2014 the trust restructured so that it now delivers services from two clinical service units - High secure and forensic services, and local and specialist services. It has eight service lines - high secure services at Broadmoor Hospital, the West London Forensic Service, integrated care services (community health services), liaison and long-term conditions (integrated mental health services), access and urgent mental health care, primary and planned mental health care, cognitive impairment and dementia, Child and Adolescent Mental Health Services (CAMHS) and developmental services.

Geographical spread
West London NHS Trust either runs or provides services at the following sites:

Corsellis Collection 
West London NHS Trust was previously the guardian of the Corsellis Collection, containing some nine thousand specimens of brains dating back to the 1950s. The Corsellis collection was originally housed at Runwell Hospital until the 1990s when a major reprovision programme was envisioned; the collection was started at Runwell Hospital by Dr John Corsellis. No larger depository of this speciality is known.

See also 
 Healthcare in London
 List of NHS trusts

References

External links 
 
 West London NHS Trust on the NHS website
 Inspection reports from the Care Quality Commission

Health in London
NHS trusts
Psychiatric hospitals in England